Acanthion is a subgenus of Old World porcupines in the genus Hystrix. It contains two species, H. javanica and H. brachyura, the smaller species with comparatively smaller nasals. The extant species have only one black ring or coloured part on the quills.

Included taxa
Hystrix (Acanthion) javanica F. Cuvier, 1823 – Sunda porcupine
Hystrix (A.) brachyura Linnaeus, 1758 – Malayan porcupine
Hystrix (A.) b. brachyura Linnaeus, 1758
Hystrix (A.) b. hodgsoni Gray, 1847
Hystrix (A.) b. subcristata Swinhoe, 1870
Hystrix (A.) b. punungensis subsp. nov.

References

Hystrix (mammal)
Animal subgenera